The 1941–42 Taça de Portugal was the fourth season of the Taça de Portugal (English: Portuguese Cup), the premier Portuguese football knockout competition, organized by the Portuguese Football Federation (FPF). Sporting Clube de Portugal was the defending champion but lost in the semi-finals to Vitória Sport Clube. The final was played on 12 June 1942 between Clube de Futebol Os Belenenses and Vitória Sport Clube.

Participating Teams

Primeira Divisão 
(12 Teams)
Associação Académica de Coimbra – Organismo Autónomo de Futebol
Académico Futebol Clube "do Porto"
Futebol Clube Barreirense
Clube de Futebol Os Belenenses
Sport Lisboa e Benfica
Boavista Futebol Clube
Carcavelinhos Football Club
Sporting Clube Olhanense
Futebol Clube do Porto
Sporting Clube de Portugal
Clube de Futebol Os Unidos "de Lisboa"
Vitória Sport Clube "de Guimarães"
Leça Futebol Clube

Segunda Divisão 
(4 Teams)
Grupo Desportivo Estoril Praia
Leixões Sport Clube
Luso Sport Clube "Beja"
Sporting Clube de Espinho

First round
In this round entered the teams from Primeira Divisão (1st level) and Segunda Divisão (2nd level).

Results

Replays

Quarterfinals

Results

Replays

Semifinals

Results

Final

References

External links
Official webpage 
1941–42 Taça de Portugal at zerozero.pt 

Taça de Portugal seasons
Port
Taca